Liu Teng (born 6 January 1989) is a Chinese footballer.

Career statistics

Club

Notes

References

1989 births
Living people
Chinese footballers
Association football midfielders
Singapore Premier League players
China League One players
Beijing Guoan F.C. players
Meizhou Hakka F.C. players
Yunnan Flying Tigers F.C. players
Dalian Transcendence F.C. players